Giegerich is a German surname. Notable people with the name include:

 Ann-Cathrin Giegerich (born 1992), German handball player
 Jill Giegerich (born 1952), American visual artist 
 Heinz Giegerich, German-born Scottish linguist and professor
 Karin Giegerich (born 1963), German actress
 Thomas Giegerich (born 1959), German jurist
 Wolfgang Giegerich (born 1942), German psychologist

See also
 Gingerich, surname

German-language surnames